was a Japanese musician.

As a Biwa player
Tsuruta specialized in the ancient pear-shaped plucked lute called biwa, and also sang.  She developed her own form of the Satsuma biwa, which is sometimes referred to as Tsuruta biwa. This biwa differs from the traditional Satsuma biwa in the number of frets, construction of the head, and occasionally a doubled 4th string. The additional frets allows a wider range of notes to be played which makes it possible to perform modern and western compositions.

Tsuruta achieved international attention for her New York City premiere performance, in November 1967, of Tōru Takemitsu's November Steps with the New York Philharmonic, under the direction of Seiji Ozawa (with shakuhachi player Katsuya Yokoyama).

She has many well known students, such as Yukio Tanaka, Yoshiko Sakata, and Junko Ueda.

See also
Biwa

Links
Schwebeablaut (Kinshi Tsuruta – Biwa, the World of Tsuruta Kinshi (1995))

References

1911 births
1995 deaths
20th-century Japanese musicians
Japanese women musicians
20th-century women musicians